In mathematics, the Nagata–Biran conjecture, named after Masayoshi Nagata and Paul Biran, is a generalisation of Nagata's conjecture on curves to arbitrary polarised surfaces.

Statement
Let X be a smooth algebraic surface and L be an ample line bundle on X of degree d.  The Nagata–Biran conjecture states that for sufficiently large r the Seshadri constant satisfies

References
.
. See in particular page 3 of the pdf.

Algebraic surfaces
Conjectures